Tectaria cicutaria, the button fern, is a species of fern in the family Tectariaceae, native to the Antilles. It has thin, soft, triangular fronds up to about 3.5 feet in length; blades are once- or twice-pinnate with the final segments pinnately-lobed. The rhizome is short and erect.

References 

 GBIF entry
 USDA PLANTS Profile entry
 Phil. Journ. Sci. 2C. 410, 1907.
 Thomas H. Everett, The New York Botanical Garden illustrated encyclopedia of horticulture, Taylor & Francis, 1982, pages 3307–3308. .
 Prem Khare, "On the morphology and anatomy of Tectaria cicutaria (L.) Copel.", Proceedings of the Indian Academy of Sciences, Section B, Volume 60, Number 6 / December, 1964.
 Proctor, G.R. 1989. Ferns of Puerto Rico and the Virgin Islands. Memoirs of the New York Botanical Garden 53: 1–389.

cicutaria
Ferns of the Americas
Flora of the Caribbean
Flora of the Leeward Islands
Flora of the Windward Islands
Flora without expected TNC conservation status